Wretch may refer to:
Wretch (album), a 1991 album by Kyuss
Wretch (website), a Taiwanese web log community
The Wretch, a 2003 comic book by Phil Hester
"Wretch", a song from the Protest the Hero album Fortress

See also
Les Scélérats ("The Wretches"), 1960 French film
Wretches, 2018 South Korean film
Retching, also known as dry heaving